Jesse Milton Coburn (1853–1923) was a one-term Republican mayor of South Norwalk, Connecticut, from 1897 to 1898.

Early life and family 
Coburn was born and raised in Pittsfield, New Hampshire. He was the son of clergyman Jesse Milton Coburn and Almira Morse Coburn, who died at his birth. As a youth, he worked finishing leather in a currying shop. He attended high school in Manchester, New Hampshire, and at the Pembroke Academy in Pembroke, New Hampshire. He then worked in a doctor's office, and later studied at the Hahnemann Medical College in Philadelphia. He earned his medical degree at the Medical School of Boston University, where he was graduated in 1874.

He opened his practice in Brooklyn, Connecticut. He was soon made surgeon to the Boston and Albany Railroad.

In 1893 he moved to South Norwalk and became the surgeon for the New York, New Haven and Hartford Railroad, as well as city physician of South Norwalk.

Political career 
In 1899, he was elected mayor of South Norwalk as a Republican.

Associations 
 Member, Independent Order of Odd Fellows
 Fleet Surgeon, Norwalk Yacht Club
 Chairman, Worship Committee, Congregational Church

References 

1853 births
1923 deaths
American people of Scottish descent
Burials at Mountain Grove Cemetery, Bridgeport
American Congregationalists
Connecticut Republicans
Mayors of Norwalk, Connecticut
Connecticut Prohibitionists
Physicians from Connecticut
Boston University School of Medicine alumni
People from Pittsfield, New Hampshire